Karolína Plíšková was the defending champion, but chose not to participate this year.

Donna Vekić won the title, defeating Johanna Konta in the final, 2–6, 7–6(7–3), 7–5.

Seeds

Draw

Finals

Top half

Bottom half

Qualifying

Seeds

Qualifiers

Draw

First qualifier

Second qualifier

Third qualifier

Fourth qualifier

Fifth qualifier

Sixth qualifier

References
 Main Draw
 Qualifying Draw

Nottingham Open andnbsp;- Singles
2017 Women's Singles